Lawrence Okoye (born 6 October 1991) is a British track and field athlete and former American football defensive tackle. He is the British record holder in the discus event. Okoye became the first ever British athlete to win a medal in Discus at a European Championships during Munich 2022. He has also played rugby union.

Personal life
Born in Croydon in South London to Nigerian parents, Okoye was educated at St Mary's Roman Catholic Junior School, a voluntary aided Roman Catholic state primary school in Croydon, followed by Whitgift School, an independent school for boys, also in Croydon.

Okoye is an honorary member of the St Peter's College JCR, and has an offer from the University of Oxford to study law which he is keen to take up in the future.

He played rugby union as a winger for Whitgift School playing in the Daily Mail Schools Rugby Under 18 final at Twickenham in 2010, and was also a member of the academy teams of both London Irish and London Wasps.

Lawrence married Philippa Okoye in August 2014, however, the pair separated in 2017.

Okoye was arrested on 6 February 2019 as part of a reverse prostitution sting in Shelby County, Alabama, four days before the kickoff of the Birmingham Iron's inaugural season. The charges were later dropped.

Discus
Okoye began training full-time in the discus in September 2010 after a promising career as a junior rugby union player. In his first international outing he came sixth in the discus throw at the 2010 World Junior Championships in Athletics. He won a gold medal at the 2011 European Athletics U23 Championships in July 2011 at the age of 19.

Later on that season, Okoye threw a new British record of 67.63m at the McCain Jumps & Throws Fest. He then bettered that mark with another British record of 68.24m at the Hallesche Werfertage meeting in May 2012.

In the 2012 Summer Olympics, Okoye competed in the discus, reaching the final with a throw of 65.28m. In the final, he finished in twelfth place with a throw of 61.03m. After the competition, he expressed disappointment with his placing in the final.

After leaving American football, Okoye competed in the 2019 Anniversary Games. This was his first competition since 2012. His best result of 2019 was 60.80 m at the Olympic Stadium on 21 July 2019. In 2020, his season best was 65.15 m in Magdeburg and in 2021, 65.56 m in Winchester before he won the discus event at 2021 European Athletics Team Championships. In 2022 he won the Silver medal in the Birmingham Commonwealth Games and Bronze in the European Championships in Munich.

NFL career

2013 NFL Combine

2013 NFL Draft
In March 2013, Okoye announced his intentions to play in the National Football League, despite having never played American football at school or university; he stated that five NFL teams expressed interest in him, and planned to sign after the 2013 NFL Draft. At the NFL Super Regional Combine, Okoye ran the 40-yard dash in 4.78 seconds, while scoring 36 inches on the vertical jump and 10 feet, 7 inches on the broad jump. Okoye was signed on 27 April by the San Francisco 49ers.

San Francisco 49ers
On 27 August 2013, Okoye was placed on Injured Reserve after sustaining an injury in the pre-season.

On 31 August 2014, the 49ers announced that Okoye was added to the practice squad.

On 31 August 2015, Okoye was waived in order for the 49ers to make the 53-man roster.

Arizona Cardinals
On 7 September 2015, Arizona Cardinals signed Okoye to their practice squad.

On 21 October 2015, the Cardinals released Okoye from their practice squad. Head coach Bruce Arians said that a leading reason for Okoye's release was because Okoye parked his car in Arians' parking spot at team facilities.

New York Jets
On 13 November 2015, New York Jets signed Okoye to their practice squad.

Okoye signed a reserve/future contract on 11 January 2016.

The Jets released Okoye on 1 June 2016.

Dallas Cowboys
Cowboys signed Okoye on 8 June 2016, but he was released on 3 September 2016 during final roster cuts.

Chicago Bears
On 23 November 2016, Okoye was signed to the Bears' practice squad.

Miami Dolphins
On 12 January 2017, Okoye signed a reserve/future contract with the Dolphins. He was waived on 2 September 2017.

CFL career

Montreal Alouettes

On 18 September 2017, Okoye signed to the practice squad of Montreal Alouettes of the Canadian Football League. He was put on the active roster and played his first CFL game on 29 September against the Calgary Stampeders, recording one tackle. He was released on 8 October 2017 and re-signed by the Alouettes on 19 May 2018.

AAF career

Birmingham Iron

On 12 October 2018, Okoye signed for the Birmingham Iron of the Alliance of American Football ahead of the inaugural season of the League in 2019. He made the 52-man roster on 30 January 2019. He was placed on injured reserve on 20 February 2019. The league ceased operations in April 2019.

References

External links
 Official website
 
 
 

Living people
1991 births
People from Croydon
British male discus throwers
English male discus throwers
People educated at Whitgift School
Athletes (track and field) at the 2012 Summer Olympics
Olympic athletes of Great Britain
English players of American football
English people of Nigerian descent
San Francisco 49ers players
Arizona Cardinals players
New York Jets players
Dallas Cowboys players
Chicago Bears players
Miami Dolphins players
Montreal Alouettes players
Birmingham Iron players
Track and field athletes in the National Football League
Athletes (track and field) at the 2020 Summer Olympics
British Athletics Championships winners
European Athletics Championships medalists
Commonwealth Games silver medallists for England
Commonwealth Games medallists in athletics
Athletes (track and field) at the 2022 Commonwealth Games
Medallists at the 2022 Commonwealth Games